M. P. Vincent is an Indian National Congress politician from Thrissur and Member of the Legislative Assembly of Ollur Assembly Constituency to Kerala Legislative Assembly in 2011.

Early life
Vincent was born on 19 January 1964 in Pudukad, Thrissur District. He completed his schooling at St. Mary's High School, Chengalore in 1979 and later joined Christ College, Irinjalakuda in 1984.

References

External links

Indian National Congress politicians from Kerala
Malayali politicians
Politicians from Thrissur
1964 births
Living people
Kerala MLAs 2011–2016